Gstrein is a surname. Notable people with the surname include:

Bernhard Gstrein (born 1965), Austrian alpine skier
Hugo Gstrein, Austrian cross-country skier
Josl Gstrein (1917–1980), Austrian cross-country and Nordic combined skier
Norbert Gstrein (born 1961), Austrian writer
Matthew Gstrein (born 1989), Australian beer drinker and below average cyclist